This list List of Southern Baptist Convention affiliated people includes notable individuals who are or were members of a church affiliated with the Southern Baptist Convention (SBC) or who are otherwise affiliated with the SBC.

Presidents, preachers, theologians, authors and missionaries

Deceased

 Annie Armstrong (1850–1938) - instrumental in founding the Woman's Missionary Union
 George Washington Baines (1809–1882) - President of Baylor University
 Sion Blythe (1781–1835) - Pastor, church founder and revivalist
 James Petigru Boyce (1827–1888) - Pastor, theologian, author, and seminary professor, founding President of the Southern Baptist Theological Seminary
 John Albert Broadus (1827–1895) - Pastor and professor and President at the Southern Baptist Theological Seminary
 John G. Burkhalter - Highly decorated U.S. Army Chaplain who served in World War II and the Korean War.
 LaVerne Butler (1926–2010) - Pastor, college president
 Benajah Harvey Carroll (1843–1914) - Pastor, theologian, teacher, and author
 Grady C. Cothen (1920–2017) - State Convention Executive Secretary-Director for the Southern Baptist Convention (1961–66), pastor, president of New Orleans Baptist Theological Seminary, president of Oklahoma Baptist University, and author.
 W. A. Criswell (1909–2002) - Pastor of First Baptist Church of Dallas, Texas, author, Southern Baptist Convention President (1968–1970)
 Chuck Colson (1931–2012) - Founder of Prison Fellowship and author

 Jerry Falwell (1933–2007) - Pastor, televangelist, Liberty University founder
 Richard Fuller (1804–1876) - Served as President of the Southern Baptist Convention from 1859–1863
 Richard Furman (1755–1825) - First president of the Triennial Convention, President of the South Carolina State Baptist Convention
 Billy Graham (1918–2018) - Evangelist, pastor, educator, and founder of the Billy Graham Evangelistic Association. Billy Graham preached over forty crusades. In addition, Graham established the Hour of Decision radio program, Decision Magazine, Christianity Today, and World Wide Pictures
 J. D. Grey (1906–1985) - Pastor of First Baptist Church of New Orleans, Louisiana (1937–1972) and SBC President (1952–1954)
 Mordecai Ham (1877–1961) - Radio and traveling evangelist
 Brooks Hays - Southern Baptist Convention President from 1958 to 1959
 Herschel Hobbs - President from 1961-1963
 Hosea Holcombe (1780–1841) - Historian and President of the Alabama Baptist State Convention from 1833 to 1838
 Alma Hunt - Executive secretary of the Woman's Missionary Union
 H. Dale Jackson (1930–2003) - Pastor and ethicist
 William Bullein Johnson (1782–1862) - First president of the Southern Baptist Convention from 1845 to 1851
 B.R. Lakin (1901–1984) - Preacher and evangelist
Homer G Lindsey (1927–2000) - Preacher at First Baptist Church in Jacksonville, FL

 Thomas Meredith (1795–1850) - Founder and editor of the Biblical Recorder newspaper
 Duke K. McCall (1914–2013) - Former President of New Orleans Baptist Theological Seminary, Southern Baptist Theological Seminary, the Baptist World Alliance, and served as General Secretary of the Southern Baptist Convention.
 Lottie Moon (1840–1912) - Missionary to China with the Foreign Mission Board (the SBC's annual Christmas offering for international missions is named for her)
 Edgar Young Mullins (1860–1928) - Minister and educator, fourth president of the Southern Baptist Theological Seminary
 Louie De Votie Newton (1892–1986) - President of the Southern Baptist Convention (1947–1948), President of the Georgia Baptist Convention, preacher, author, and  Vice President of the Baptist World Alliance
 J. Frank Norris (1877–1952) - Preacher, left the SBC for the Independent Baptist movement, one of the most controversial figures in the history of fundamentalism
 Cicero Washington Pruitt (1857–1946) - One of the first missionaries to Northern China, ordained minister at the age of fourteen, and textual translator
 James A. Ranaldson (1789–1849) - Minister, founder of the Alabama Baptist Convention, missionary, and church founder.
 Bronson Ray (1868–1934) - Southern Baptist minister who would then become the Executive Secretary of the present day International Mission Board
 Archibald Thomas Robertson (1863–1934) - Biblical scholar
 Adrian Rogers (1931–2005) - Pastor, conservative, author, and Southern Baptist Convention President 1979–1980 and 1986–1988
 Lee Rutland Scarborough (1870–1945) - President of the Southern Baptist Convention (1938–1940), President of the Baptist General Convention of Texas (1929–1932), and as the President of the Southwestern Baptist Theological Seminary (1908–1942)
 J. Harold Smith (1910–2001) - Pastor and founder of Radio Bible Hour
 Frank Stagg (1911–2001) - Southern Baptist pastor, theologian, author and professor. Stagg served as a professor at both New Orleans Baptist Theological Seminary (1945–1964) and at Southern Baptist Theological Seminary (1964–1978)
 John Roach Straton (1875–1929) - Pastor
William G. Tanner (1930–2007) - Served as president of Oklahoma Baptist University from 1966 to 1970, president of the North American Mission Board, as a pastor, educator, administrator, and denominational leader
George Washington Truett (1867–1944) - Served as the President of the Southern Baptist Convention from 1927 to 1929, pastor of First Baptist Church in Dallas, President of the Baptist World Alliance, as a minister and writer

Living

 Daniel L. Akin - President of Southeastern Baptist Theological Seminary (2004-   ), and author.
 Charles C. Baldwin, Chief of Chaplains of the U.S. Air Force 2004–2008
 Mac Brunson - Pastor of Valleydale Baptist Church in Birmingham Alabama, Historian and Author.
Wade Burleson - Author, historian, and Lead Pastor at Emmanuel Enid, Oklahoma
 Ergun Caner -  Preacher, Apologist, Author. Former President of Brewton-Parker College in Mount Vernon, Georgia. He previously served as the Provost and Vice President of Academic Affairs at Arlington Baptist College and was the former dean of the Liberty Baptist Theological Seminary and Graduate School of Liberty University 
 Douglas Carver - Major General who previously served as the Chief of Chaplains of the United States Army
 Morris Chapman - Southern Baptist Convention President 1990–1992, Former President and CEO of the SBC Executive Committee
 Dondi E. Costin - Chief of Chaplains, U. S. Air Force
 Ted Cruz - Texas Senator, and 2016 presidential candidate
 Mark Dever - Senior pastor of the Capitol Hill Baptist Church in Washington, D.C.
 James T. Draper, Jr. - Southern Baptist Convention president from 1982–1984
 Ronnie Floyd - former Senior Pastor of Cross Church and The Church At Pinnacle Hills, and is an author
 Steve Gaines - Pastor of Bellevue Baptist Church, a mega church in Memphis, Tennessee
 Timothy George - Southern Baptist minister, acting dean of Beeson Divinity School at Samford University, executive director of Christianity Today, and served on the board of directors for Lifeway Christian Resources of the Southern Baptist Convention
 Franklin Graham - Evangelist and missionary (son of Billy Graham)
 Jack Graham - President of the SBC from 2002–2004; current pastor of the 43,000+ person mega-church Prestonwood Baptist Church in Plano, Texas
 J. D. Greear - President of the Southern Baptist Convention from 2018-2021, Senior Pastor of The Summit Church
 Corey J. Hodges - African-American preacher and columnist for Salt Lake Tribune
 Johnny Hunt - President of the Southern Baptist Convention from 2008–2010, is a pastor and author
 Robert Jeffress - Pastor of First Baptist Church (Dallas), a mega church in Dallas, TX
 David Jeremiah - Pastor of Shadow Mountain Community Church, a mega church in El Cajon, California
 Richard Land - President of the Southern Evangelical Seminary in Charlotte, NC; Former President of The Ethics & Religious Liberty Commission of the SBC
 Phillip Lee, Jr. - Deputy Chief of Chaplains for Reserve Matters of the United States Navy
 Fred L. Lowery - Pastor of First Baptist Church of Bossier City, Louisiana, 1983–2013, televangelist and author
 Fred Luter - Southern Baptist Convention President 2012–2014
 Dwight McKissic - pastor, leader of Bapticostal movement
 James Merritt - President of the Southern Baptist Convention from 2000–2002
 R. Albert Mohler, Jr. - President of The Southern Baptist Theological Seminary
 Russell D. Moore - President of the Southern Baptist Ethics & Religious Liberty Commission

 Frank Page, Former President and CEO of the SBC Executive Committee
 Paige Patterson - Eighth president of the Southwestern Baptist Theological Seminary in Fort Worth, Texas
 David Platt - Former President of the International Mission Board, former Senior Pastor of The Church at Brook Hills in Birmingham, AL, current Lead Pastor of  McLean Bible Church, and author of the New York Times Best Seller, Radical: Taking Back Your Faith from the American Dream
 Paul Pressler - retired Texas judge and a leader with Paige Patterson of the Southern Baptist Convention Conservative resurgence, beginning with the convention in Houston in 1979
 Thom S. Rainer - former President and Ceo LifeWay Christian Resources in Nashville, Tennessee
 Charles F. Stanley - Pastor Emeritus First Baptist Church of Atlanta, Georgia, and founder of In Touch Ministries. President of the Southern Baptist Convention from 1984 to 1986.

 Jeff Struecker - Pastor, author and former U.S. Army Ranger Chaplain
 Bob Utley- Biblical scholar, author, and preparer for the Southern Baptist Convention Sunday School Lesson Series.
 Jerry Vines - President of the Southern Baptist Convention from 1988 to 1990 and as pastor of the First Baptist Church of Jacksonville, Florida
 Rick Warren - pastor of the 20,000+ member Saddleback Church in California and author of The Purpose-Driven Life
 David W. Whitlock - 15th President of Oklahoma Baptist University, Shawnee, OK
 Bryant Wright - Southern Baptist Convention President 2010–2012
 Homer Edwin Young - President of the Southern Baptist Convention (1992–1994), serves as Head Pastor of Second Baptist Church Houston, is an author, and is the creator of the broadcast ministry, the Winning Walk
 Paul Washer (born 1961) - evangelist and preacher, founder of the HeartCry Missionary Society

Entertainers

 Mark Carman - Singer, musician, composer, writer, producer
 Clarence Clemons - Musician and actor
 Jerry Clower - Comedian, raconteur, and member of the Grand Ole Opry
 Dakota Fanning - actress
 Elle Fanning - actress
 Donald Hustad - musician, composer, and organist for Campus Crusade
 Grady Nutt - comedian on Hee Haw
 Bobby Sowell - musician, pianist, composer
 Deborah Voigt - opera singer

Politicians

 Sharron Angle (R-NV) – Member of the Nevada Assembly (2003–2007); lost U.S. Senate race in 2010 to Harry Reid
 Robert J. Bentley (R-AL) – U.S. Governor of Alabama (2011–2017)
 Matt Bevin (R-KY) – Businessman and U.S. Governor of Kentucky (2015-2019)
 Matt Blunt (R-MO) – Missouri Secretary of State (2001–2005) and Governor (2005–2009)
 Brad Carson (D-OK) – U.S. Representative (2001–2005)
 Travis Childers (D-MS) – U.S. Representative (2008–2011)
 Tom Coburn (R-OK) – Southern Baptist ordained deacon, U.S. Representative (1995–2001), and U.S. Senator (2005–2014)
 Doug Collins - (R-GA) - U.S. Representative (2013–2021)
 Rick Crawford (R-AR) – U.S. Representative (2011–present)
 Ted Cruz (R-TX) – U.S. Senator (2013–present)
 Greg Davis (R-MS) – State Representative (1991–1997), Mayor (1997-present)
 John Fleming (R-LA) – U.S. Representative (2009–2017)
 Bill Flores (R-TX) – U.S. Representative (2011–2021)
 Lindsey Graham (R-SC) – U.S. Senator (2003–present)
 Tom Graves (R-GA) – U.S. Representative (2010–present)
 Mike Huckabee - Southern Baptist Minister, governor of Arkansas, and Republican candidate in the 2008 and 2016 Presidential primaries
 Duncan L. Hunter (R-CA) – former US Congressman from San Diego County
 Mike Johnson (R-LA) – Constitutional attorney specializing in traditional values issues and member of the Louisiana House of Representatives
 Ben Jones (D-GA) – former U.S. Representative from Georgia, also played Cooter Davenport in The Dukes of Hazzard
 Larry Kissell (D-NC) – U.S. Representative (2009–2013)

 Ronnie Musgrove (D-MS) – U.S. Lieutenant Governor (1996–2000) and Governor of Mississippi (2000–2004)
 Sonny Perdue (R-GA) – Governor of Georgia (2003–2011), U.S. Secretary of Agriculture
 Scott Pruitt (R-OK) - Oklahoma Senator (1999-2007), Attorney General of Oklahoma (2011-2017), EPA Administrator (2017–2018)
 Mark Pryor - (D-AR) U.S. Senator (2003–2015)
 Chip Pickering (R-MS) – U.S. Representative (1997–2009)
 Harry S. Truman (D-MO) – former President of the United States.
 Roger Wicker (R-MS) – U.S. Senator (2007–present)
 Steve Womack (R-AR) – U.S. Representative (2011–present)
 Jason Zachary (R-TN) – State Representative (2015–present)
 Randy Forbes (R-VA04) – U.S. Representative (2001–2017)
 Kevin McCarthy (R-CA) – U.S. Representative (2007–present) Member of Valley Baptist Church in Bakersfield CA
 Ron Paul (R-TX) – U.S. Representative (1976–1977, 1975–1989, 1997–2013)

Other
 Truett Cathy - businessman, founder of Chick-fil-A
 Zach Johnson - professional golfer
 Shu-tian Li - Chinese-American engineer and academic
 Tim Tebow - NFL football player

Ex-members
 Alton Brown - celebrity chef and TV host.
 Belinda Carlisle - singer. In an interview with Slash magazine, she described herself as a reject from a Southern Baptist household and is now a practicing Buddhist.
 Jimmy Carter - former President of the United States. During his presidential campaign, Carter introduced the term "born-again" into mainstream American politics. Carter publicly identifies himself with the Cooperative Baptist Fellowship because of his differences with the conservative direction of the SBC leadership and beliefs. In 2000 he announced that he was severing all links with the Southern Baptist Convention because of what he viewed as gender discrimination.
 Bill Clinton - former President of the United States. Raised Southern Baptist, but left the Convention due to disagreement with its conservative positions. Working with Jimmy Carter to conduct "Celebration of a New Baptist Covenant" meeting of over 30 liberal Baptist denominations and organizations in the US and Canada, which was held in Atlanta, January 30—February 1, 2008.<ref>"Carter & Clinton call for 'New Baptist Covenant.'" Baptist Press," January 10, 2007.</ref>
 Kevin Costner - actor. Baptized at First Southern Baptist Church in Bakersfield, California as a boy.
 Al Gore - Vice-President of the United States (1993–2001); Democratic presidential candidate in 2000. Gore was raised as a Southern Baptist, but like Carter and Clinton, he formally left the Southern Baptist Convention due to his disagreements with many of the SBC's conservative positions.
 Bill Moyers - raised a Southern Baptist and educated at Southwestern Baptist Theological Seminary. Now a member of The Riverside Church in New York City, a dually-aligned American Baptist-United Church of Christ congregation. Press secretary to President Lyndon B. Johnson, later publisher of Newsday'', and well-known journalist and TV commentator (CBS and PBS).
 Brad Pitt - Famous television actor; raised Southern Baptist, now agnostic.
 Britney Spears - Singer, dancer, actress. She sang in a Baptist church choir as a child, but later in life studied Kabbalist teachings.
 Ethel Cain - Singer-songwriter. Grew up in the church as the daughter of a deacon, but in 2022 stated in a Tumblr post that she no longer considers herself Christian, but abides by the values she was taught growing up.

See also
 List of Baptists
 List of state and other conventions associated with the Southern Baptist Convention
 Southern Baptist Convention Presidents

References

 
Bapt